Round-tripping, also known as round-trip transactions or "Lazy Susans", is defined by The Wall Street Journal as a form of barter that involves a company selling "an unused asset to another company, while at the same time agreeing to buy back the same or similar assets at about the same price."  Swapping assets on a round-trip produces no net economic substance, but may be fraudulently reported  as a series of productive sales and beneficial purchases on the books of the companies involved, violating the substance over form accounting principle.  The companies appear to be growing and very busy, but the round-tripping business does not generate profits.  Growth is an attractive factor to speculative investors, even if profits are lacking; such investment benefits companies and motivates them to undertake the illusory growth of round-tripping. They played a crucial part in temporarily inflating the market capitalization of energy traders such as Enron, CMS Energy, Reliant Energy, Dynegy and Wirecard. 

In international scenarios, round-tripping is a method of structuring to evade taxes and to launder money.

Other companies making unconventional round-tripping deals include AOL with Sun Microsystems and Global Crossing with Qwest Communications. It is alleged that when some telecommunications companies swapped capacity, they booked the value of the incoming capacity as revenue and the value of the outgoing capacity as an investment. These transactions had the effect of inflating profits. The SEC ruled that booking revenues from swaps in telecommunications capacity was improper.

Many such companies have used round-tripping to distort the market by establishing false revenue benchmarks, aiming to meet or beat the numbers put out by Wall Street stock analysts. As a result of abusive round trips, barter between publicly held companies has become discredited among professional investors.

See also
 Accounting scandals
 Bill and hold
 Channel stuffing
 Forensic accounting
 List of corporate collapses and scandals
 Painting the tape

References

External links
Forbes.com Round Tripping On Energy, May 16, 2002.
Commercial crimes
Finance fraud